Beyond the Gate may refer to:

Beyond the Gate (film), a 1979 film
Beyond the Gate (album), a 2006 album by Moi dix Mois
Beyond the Gate, an album by Wretched